Oruj (also Romanized as Orūj; also known as Oruch, Orudzh, Owrūj, Ūroj, and Ūrūj) is a village in Nowjeh Mehr Rural District, Siah Rud District, Jolfa County, East Azerbaijan Province, Iran. At the 2006 census, its population was 131, in 32 families.

References 

Populated places in Jolfa County